The Piper PA-35 Pocono was an American 16/18 seat commuter airliner developed by Piper in the late 1960s. Only one aircraft was built and the design was not developed.

Design and development
Piper started the design work in 1965 for a twin-engined piston non-pressurized commuter airliner and the prototype first flew on 13 May 1968. It was a low-wing monoplane that was intended to be powered by two  Lycoming TIO-720-B1A piston engines then under development. It was planned that the aircraft would be built at the new factory at Lakeland Municipal Airport in Florida. Due to problems during development the tail area was increased, the fuselage stretched and the engines uprated to  variants.

Development was stopped in 1969 initially to let the company develop other aircraft, but the halt was also influenced by the lack of a suitable engine and a number of third-level airline operators in the United States going out of business. In 1970 the company proposed a four-engined and a turboprop version, but they were not developed.

In about 1978 a cooperation program between Piper and WSK Mielec (Poland) was planned. As part of this one fuselage with wings was transported from Florida to Poland and a team of designers was assembled at the R&D Center in Mielec. The program was named M-19, with designer Tadeusz Widełka as the team leader. The program was abandoned when the An-28 program was launched in Mielec and the PA-35 fuselage was moved to the Technical University in Rzeszów. Later, probably in 1994, the aircraft was moved to the city of Widełka.

Specifications (1969 variant)

References

Notes

Bibliography

1960s United States civil utility aircraft
Pocono
Low-wing aircraft
Abandoned civil aircraft projects of the United States
Poland–United States relations
Aircraft first flown in 1968
1960s United States airliners
Twin piston-engined tractor aircraft